Marinka is a village in Burgas Municipality, in Burgas Province, in southeastern Bulgaria.

Honours
Marinka Point on Brabant Island, Antarctica is named after the village.

References

Villages in Burgas Province